The Poona Dam is an earth-fill embankment dam with a toe drain with an un-gated spillway across a tributary of the South Maroochy River in Kureelpa, Sunshine Coast Region,  Queensland, Australia. The main purpose of the dam is for storage of potable water for the Sunshine Coast region. The impounded reservoir is also called Poona Dam.

Location and features

Initially managed by the Maroochy Shire Council, management of the dam was transferred to SEQ Water in July 2008 as part of a water security project in the South East Queensland region, known as the South East Queensland Water Grid.

Recreation
Recreation is not permitted on the dam and in its surrounds.

In 2008, the body of a deceased man was found on the eastern spillway of the dam wall.

See also

List of dams in Queensland

References

External links

Reservoirs in Queensland
Buildings and structures on the Sunshine Coast, Queensland
Dams completed in 1959
Dams in Queensland
1959 establishments in Australia
Embankment dams
Earth-filled dams